Sazā-ye Maut (English: Death Penalty) is 1981 Indian film directed and produced by Vidhu Vinod Chopra. The films was based on Chopra's diploma film at FTII, Murder at Monkey Hill (1976). He adapted that into a full-length feature, with Naseeruddin Shah and Radha Saluja, respectively, playing the roles that he, himself, and Anjali Paigankar had played in the short film.

Cast
 Naseeruddin Shah as Uday Jagirdar / Omkar Puri
 Radha Saluja as Malika Modi
 Naresh Suri as Baldev
 Anjan Srivastav as Uday's lawyer
 Francis Menezes as Mr. Modi
 Dilip Dhawan as Anil Suri

Plot
Malika Modi lives a very wealthy lifestyle with her widowed dad in India where they own vast acres of land and businesses. When Mr. Modi suddenly passes away, he leaves all the business's interests with his younger brother conditionally until Malika turns 25. Shortly before she turned 25, Malika is told by a young man, Uday Jagirdar, that she is about to get killed, and the person to kill her is none other than Uday himself. Malika disbelieves him and runs for her life. She finds out that Uday is not chasing her but another man, Anil Suri, an employee of her uncle's. Malika knows now that she has no choice but to seek help from Uday, her very own paid assailant. What Malika does not know is that Uday is not who he claims to be, but is actually a deranged former mental patient who is accused of murder.

References

External links 
 

1980s Hindi-language films
1981 films
Films directed by Vidhu Vinod Chopra
Indian black-and-white films